This is a list of notable Argentinean musicians and singers:

 Alejandro Toledo (musician)
 Los Auténticos Decadentes
 Ataque 77
 Almendra
 Babasónicos
 Charly García
 Gustavo Cerati
 Indica – Rock band formed in 2006 in Buenos Aires
 La Empoderada Orquesta Atípica
 Los Enanitos Verdes
 Los Fabulosos Cadillacs
 Fito Páez
 Flema
 Kapanga
 La Renga
 Lex Talion – Viking metal/folk metal band
 Los Pericos
 Martha Argerich
 Miranda!
 Patricio Rey y sus Redonditos de Ricota
 Pescado Rabioso
 Puente Celeste
 Serú Girán
 Soda Stereo
 Sui Generis
 Todos Tus Muertos
 Virus (band)
 Xavier Moyano

See also

 List of Argentines
 Lists of musicians

 
Musicians
Argentine
Musicians